Cuneo International Airport  also named Cuneo Levaldigi Airport or Turin Cuneo Airport by some low-cost airlines, is an airport serving Cuneo and Turin, Piedmont, Italy. It is the second airport of Piedmont, after Turin Airport.

Facilities

Airlines and destinations
The following airlines operate regular scheduled and charter flights at Cuneo Airport:

Statistics

References

External links
 Official website
 
 

Airports in Piedmont
Transport in Cuneo